The African Popular Movement (in French: Mouvement Populaire Africain) was a political party in Upper Volta, led by Nazi Boni. MPA was founded in 1955 following a split in the Voltaic Union.

In the 1957 Territorial Assembly elections MPA won five seats. After the elections MPA joined the Voltaic Solidarity (SV) grouping. 

In 1957 MPA joined the African Convention of Léopold Sédar Senghor.

In 1958 MPA, along with the rest of CA, merged into the African Regroupment Party (PRA).

Source: Englebert, Pierre. La Revolution Burkinabè. Paris: L'Harmattan, 1986.

1955 establishments in French Upper Volta
1958 disestablishments in French West Africa
Defunct political parties in Burkina Faso
Political parties disestablished in 1958
Political parties established in 1955